Javier Busto Sagrado (born 1949 in Hondarribia, Basque Country, Spain) is a Spanish choral music composer and conductor.

Career
Originally trained as a medical doctor, Busto taught himself music, but was initiated to choir direction by Erwin List. In 1995, he founded Kanta Cantemus Korua, a choir composed of women in their middle to late teens. In 1978 he founded the Eskifaia Choir in Hondarribia.

Busto has presented his compositions at the Fourth World Symposium on Choral Music in Sydney, Australia in 1996, and was guest conductor of the Tokyo Cantat in 2000. His choirs have won first place awards in France, Italy, Austria, and Germany. Busto has served on the jury of composition and choral competitions in Spain, France, Italy and Japan.

Works
Busto's compositions are published in Sweden, Germany, Spain and the United States.

SATB
Ametsetan
Agnus Dei
Ave Maria       
Ave maris stella
Ave verum corpus
Laudate pueri      
O sacrum convivium      
O magnum mysterium
Pater Noster         
The Lord Is My Shepherd  
Zutaz (divisi, a cappella)
Missa pro defunctis (divisi, clarinete, soprano and bariton solos a cappella)

SSAA
Magnificat         
Popule Meus    
Laudate Dominum
Salve Regina 
Bustapi     
Ave Maria Gratia Plena      
Hodie Christus Natus Est

TTBB
Cuatro cantos penitenciales

References

External links
bustovega
Javier Busto's Composer Profile at waltonmusic.com

1949 births
Living people
Choral composers
Spanish composers
Spanish male composers